Mrittika is a feminine given name of Bengali origin and is most common in Eastern India, Northeastern India, and Bangladesh. The name means "mother earth" or "soil". It is used by both Hindus and Muslims. 

Given names
Bengali names